The Kitchen Cabinet is a BBC Radio 4 programme hosted by Jay Rayner in which members of the public can put questions to a panel of experts about food and cooking.

History
The programme was first broadcast on 7 Feb 2012;  it is in its 39th series. It is a Somethin' Else production.

Format
The show is a similar format to the long established  Gardeners Question Time, coming from public venues at interesting 'food locations' in Britain in front of an audience. Panel members have included the food historian Professor Peter Barham, James 'Jocky' Petrie, the former Head of Creative Development for Heston Blumenthal and food writer Tim Hayward.

References

External links
 The Kitchen Cabinet at the BBC website

BBC Radio 4 programmes
Radio programs about food and drink